Kladenets may refer to:

 Kladenets, Haskovo Province, a village in southern Bulgaria
 Kladenets, Shumen Province, a village in Shumen Municipality, northeastern Bulgaria
 Sword Kladenets, a magic sword in traditional Russian fairy tales